This list of the Cenozoic life of Utah contains the various prehistoric life-forms whose fossilized remains have been reported from within the US state of Utah and are between 66 million and 10,000 years of age.

A

 Abies
 †Achaenodon
 †Achaenodon uintensis – type locality for species
 †Acmeodon
 †Acrocera
 †Acrocera hirsuta – type locality for species
 †Aenocyon 
 †Aenocyon dirus – or unidentified comparable form
 †Aepinacodon
 †Aethomylos
 †Aethomylos simplicidens
 †Ageina – or unidentified comparable form
  †Agriochoerus
 †Agriochoerus maximus
 Alligator
  †Allognathosuchus – or unidentified comparable form
 †Allophaiomys
 †Allophaiomys pliocaenicus
 Amia
 †Amia uintensis
  Amyda
 †Amyda crassa – type locality for species
 †Amyda gregaria
 †Amynodon
 †Amynodon advenus
 †Amynodon reedi
 †Anaptomorphus
 †Anaptomorphus aemulus
 †Anemorhysis
 †Anisonchus
 †Anisonchus athelas
 †Anisonchus oligistus
 †Anisonchus onostus
 †Anisonchus sectorius
  †Anosteira
 †Anosteira ornata
 Anthonomus
 †Anthonomus soporus
 †Antiacodon
 †Antiacodon pygmaeus
  Antilocapra
 †Antilocapra americana – or unidentified comparable form
  Apalone
 †Apataelurus
 †Apataelurus kayi – type locality for species
 †Apatemys
 †Apatemys bellulus – or unidentified comparable form
 †Apatemys bellus – or unidentified comparable form
 †Apatemys rodens – or unidentified comparable form
 †Apatemys uintensis – type locality for species
 †Aphronorus
 †Aphronorus simpsoni
  †Arctodus
 †Arctodus simus
 †Armintodelphys
 †Armintodelphys dawsoni
 †Artemisia
 †Asilopsis – type locality for genus
 †Asilopsis fusculus – type locality for species
 †Asilus
 †Asilus palaeolestes – type locality for species
 †Aulobaris
 †Aulobaris circumscripta
 †Aulobaris comminuta – type locality for species
 †Auxontodon
 †Auxontodon pattersoni

B

 †Baena
 †Baena arenosa – type locality for species
 †Baena emiliae
 †Baptemys
 †Basirepomys
 †Basirepomys robertsi – type locality for species
 †Bembidium
 †Bembidium exoletum – type locality for species
 Bison
  †Bison latifrons – tentative report
 †Bittacus
 †Bittacus egestionis – type locality for species
 †Blickomylus
 †Blickomylus moroni – type locality for species
 †Bootherium
  †Bootherium bombifrons
  †Boverisuchus
 †Boverisuchus vorax – type locality for species
 †Brachyhyops
 †Brachyhyops wyomingensis
 Brachylagus
 †Brachylagus idahoensis – or unidentified comparable form
 †Bridgeremys
 †Bridgeremys pusilla – tentative report
 †Bunomeryx
 †Bunomeryx montanus – type locality for species

C

  †Camelops
 †Camelops hesternus – or unidentified comparable form
 Camponotus
 †Camponotus vetus – type locality for species
 Canis
  
 †Canis latrans – tentative report
 †Canis lupus
 †Capricamelus
 †Carabites
 †Carabites eocenicus – type locality for species
 †Carabites exanimus – type locality for species
 †Catopsalis
 †Catopsalis fissidens
 †Cedrelospermum
 †Cedrelospermum nervosum
 †Centetodon
 †Centetodon bembicophagus
 †Centetodon pulcher
  †Champsosaurus
 Chara
 Cheilosia
 †Cheilosia scudderi
 †Chipetaia
 †Chipetaia lamporea – type locality for species
  †Chisternon
 †Chisternon undatum – type locality for species
 †Chriacus
 †Chriacus baldwini
 †Cicindelopsis – type locality for genus
 †Cicindelopsis eophilus – type locality for species
 †Colodon
 †Compsemys
 †Compsemys victa
 †Conacodon
 †Conacodon kohlbergeri
 †Coniatus
 †Coniatus refractus
 †Conoryctella – type locality for genus
 †Conoryctella dragonensis – type locality for species
 †Conoryctella pattersoni
 †Copemys
 †Copemys mariae – or unidentified related form
  †Coryphodon
 †Coryphodon lobatus
 †Cristadjidaumo – type locality for genus
 †Cristadjidaumo mckennai – type locality for species
 Crocodylus
  †Crocodylus acer – type locality for species
 †Crocodylus affinis
 †Crypholestes
 Culex
 †Culex proavitus – type locality for species
 †Cupidinimus
 †Cuterebra
 †Cuterebra ascarides
 †Cyttaromyia – type locality for genus
 †Cyttaromyia fenestrata – type locality for species

D

 †Desmatoclaenus
 †Desmatoclaenus hermaeus
 Dicranomyia
 †Dicranomyia primitiva – type locality for species
 †Dicranomyia rostrata – type locality for species
 †Dicranomyia stigmosa – type locality for species
  †Dinohippus
  †Diplacodon
 †Diplacodon elatus
 †Diplacodon emarginatus – type locality for species
 †Diplobunops
 †Diplobunops crassus
 †Diplobunops matthewi
 †Diprionomys
 †Diprionomys minimus – or unidentified comparable form
 †Dipsalidictis
 †Dipsalidictis transiens
 †Draconodus
 †Draconodus apertus
 †Dracontolestes
 †Dracontolestes aphantus – type locality for species
 †Duchesnehippus
 †Duchesnehippus intermedius
 †Duchesneodus
 †Duchesneodus uintensis

E

  †Echmatemys
 †Echmatemys depressa – type locality for species
 †Echmatemys douglassi – type locality for species
 †Echmatemys septaria – type locality for species
 †Echmatemys uintensis
  †Ectoconus
 †Ectoconus ditrigonus
 †Ectoconus symbolus
 †Ellipsodon
 †Ellipsodon grangeri
 †Ellipsodon lemuroides
 †Ellipsodon sternbergi – type locality for species
 †Elliptio
  †Eobasileus
 †Eobasileus cornutus
 †Eobracon – type locality for genus
 †Eobracon cladurus – type locality for species
 †Eocaenonemonyx
 †Eocaenonemonyx kuscheli – type locality for species
 †Eoconodon
 †Eodiploglossus
 †Eodiploglossus borealis
 †Eoformica
 †Eoformica pinguis – type locality for species
 †Eomoropus
 †Eomoropus amarorum – type locality for species
 †Eomoropus anarsius
 †Eonessa – type locality for genus
 †Eonessa anaticula – type locality for species
 †Epicaerus
 †Epicaerus effossus
 †Epicaerus eradicatus
 †Epicaerus evigoratus
 †Epicaerus exanimis
 †Epicaerus subterraneus
 †Epicaerus terrosus
 †Epihippus
 †Epihippus gracilis
 †Epiphanis
 †Epiphanis deletus – type locality for species
 †Epitriplopus
 †Epitriplopus uintensis
 Equus
  †Equus conversidens – tentative report
 Erethizon
 †Erethizon dorsatum – tentative report
 †Eucastor
 †Eucastor tortus – or unidentified comparable form
  †Euglossopteryx – type locality for genus
 †Euglossopteryx biesmeijeri – type locality for species
 Eutamias
 †Eutamias minimus

G

 †Glyptosaurus
 †Glyptosaurus sylvestris
 †Gnoriste
 †Gnoriste dentoni – type locality for species
 †Goniacodon
 †Goniacodon hiawathae
 †Griphomys

H
 

 †Hadrianus
 †Hadrianus corsoni
 †Hadrianus utahensis – type locality for species
 †Haplaletes
 †Haplaletes andakupensis
 †Haploconus
 †Haploconus angustus
 †Haploconus elachistus
 †Haplolambda – or unidentified comparable form
 †Haplolambda simpsoni – type locality for species
  †Harpagolestes
 †Harpagolestes brevipes – type locality for species
 †Harpagolestes leotensis – type locality for species
 †Harpagolestes uintensis
 †Helaletes
 †Helaletes nanus
  †Helodermoides – tentative report
 †Heptacodon
  †Herpetotherium
 †Herpetotherium innominatum
 †Hesperolagomys
 †Hesperolagomys galbreathi
 †Hessolestes
 †Hessolestes ultimus – type locality for species
 †Heteraletes
 †Heteraletes leotanus
 †Hoplochelys
  †Hyaenodon
 †Hyaenodon vetus – or unidentified comparable form
 Hydrobia – or unidentified comparable form
 †Hylobius
 †Hylobius deleticius – type locality for species
 †Hylomeryx
 †Hylomeryx annectens
 †Hylomeryx quadricuspis – type locality for species
  †Hyopsodus
 †Hyopsodus minusculus
 †Hyopsodus paulus
 †Hyopsodus uintensis – type locality for species
 †Hypohippus
 †Hypolagus
 †Hypolagus vetus
 †Hyrachyus
 †Hyrachyus eximius
 †Hyrachyus modestus
 †Hyracodon
 †Hyracodon medius
 †Hyracotherium
 †Hyracotherium vasacciense

I

 †Isectolophus – type locality for genus
 †Isectolophus annectens – type locality for species

J

 †Janimus
 †Janimus rhinophilus – type locality for species

K

 †Kimbetohia
 †Kimbetohia campi

L

  Laccophilus
 †Lambdotherium
 †Lasioptera
 †Lasioptera recessa – type locality for species
 †Leistotrophus
 †Leistotrophus patriarchicus – type locality for species
 Lemmiscus
 †Lemmiscus curtatus
 Lepisosteus
 †Lepisosteus simplex
  †Leptomeryx
 †Leptoreodon
 †Leptoreodon marshi
 †Leptotragulus
 †Leptotragulus clarki
 †Leptotragulus medius – type locality for species
 †Leptotragulus proavus
 Lepus
 †Lepus townsendii – or unidentified comparable form
 †Limalophus
 †Limalophus compositus
 †Limalophus receptus – type locality for species
  †Limnocyon
 †Limnocyon potens
 †Limnocyon verus – or unidentified comparable form
 †Liodontia
 †Lioplacoides – or unidentified comparable form
 †Litaletes
 †Litaletes gazini
 †Lithadothrips – type locality for genus
 †Lithadothrips vetusta – type locality for species
 †Loxolophus
 †Loxolophus pentacus
 †Loxolophus spiekeri
  Lynx
 †Lynx canadensis – or unidentified comparable form

M

 †Macrotarsius
 †Macrotarsius jepseni – type locality for species
 †Mammut
 †Mammut americanum
 †Mammuthus
  †Mammuthus columbi
  †Mammuthus primigenius
 Marsilea
 †Marsilea sprungerorum
 †Megalamynodon
 †Megalamynodon regalis – type locality for species
  †Megalonyx
 †Megalonyx jeffersonii
 †Menops
 †Menops marshi
 †Merriamoceros
 †Mesomeryx – type locality for genus
 †Mesomeryx grangeri – type locality for species
  †Mesonyx
 †Mesonyx obtusidens
 †Metaliomys – type locality for genus
 †Metaliomys sevierensis – type locality for species
 †Metanoiamys
 †Metanoiamys lacus
 †Metarhinus
 †Metarhinus diploconus
 †Metarhinus fluviatilis – type locality for species
 †Metarhinus parvus
 †Metatelmatherium
 †Metatelmatherium ultimum – type locality for species
  †Miacis
 †Miacis parvivorus – or unidentified comparable form
 †Microparamys
 †Microparamys dubius
 †Microparamys minutus
 †Micropternodus
 †Microsyops
 Microtus
 †Microtus montanus
 †Microtus paroperarius
 Mictomys
 †Mictomys borealis
 †Mimomys
 †Mimomys dakotaensis – or unidentified comparable form
 †Mimotricentes
 †Miocyon
 †Miocyon major – or unidentified comparable form
 †Miocyon scotti – type locality for species
 †Miocyon vallisrubrae – type locality for species
 Mustela
 †Mustela richardsonii – tentative report
 †Myrmecoboides
 †Mytonolagus
 †Mytonolagus petersoni – type locality for species
 †Mytonomeryx
 †Mytonomeryx scotti – type locality for species
 †Mytonomys
 †Mytonomys mytonensis
 †Mytonomys robustus – type locality for species

N

†Nemotelus
 †Nemotelus eocenicus – type locality for species
 Neogale
 †Neogale vison
†Neoplagiaulax
 †Neoplagiaulax macintyrei
 Neoptochus – tentative report
 Neotamias
 Neotoma
 †Notharctus
  †Notharctus tenebrosus – or unidentified comparable form
 †Nyctitherium
 †Nyctitherium serotinum

O

  Odocoileus
 †Oliveremys
 †Oliveremys uintaensis
 †Omomys
 †Omomys carteri
 †Omomys lloydi – type locality for species
  Ondatra
 †Onychodectes
 †Onychodectes tisonensis – or unidentified comparable form
 †Oodectes – tentative report
 Ophryastes
 †Ophryastes petrarum
 †Ophryastites
 †Ophryastites digressus – type locality for species
 †Orelladjidaumo – or unidentified comparable form
 †Oromeryx
 †Oromeryx plicatus – type locality for species
 †Ourayia
 †Ourayia hopsoni
 †Ourayia uintensis – type locality for species
 †Oxyacodon
 †Oxyacodon apiculatus
 †Oxyacodon ferronensis – type locality for species
 †Oxyacodon marshater – type locality for species
 †Oxyaenodon
 †Oxyaenodon dysodus
 †Oxyclaenus
 †Oxyclaenus pugnax
 †Oxygonus
 †Oxygonus mortuus – type locality for species
 †Oxytomodon
 †Oxytomodon perissum

P

 †Pachymerus
 †Pachymerus petrensis – type locality for species
 †Paenemarmota
 †Paenemarmota sawrockensis
 †Palaeictops
 †Palaeictops bridgeri
 †Palaeoeristalis – type locality for genus
 †Palaeoeristalis tesselatus – type locality for species
 †Palaeothrips – type locality for genus
 †Palaeothrips fossilis – type locality for species
 †Palaeoxantusia
 †Pantolestes
 †Pantolestes longieundus – or unidentified comparable form
 †Paradjidaumo
 †Paradjidaumo alberti – or unidentified comparable form
 †Paradjidaumo trilophus
  †Paramylodon
 †Paramylodon harlani – or unidentified comparable form
 †Paramys
 †Paramys compressidens – type locality for species
 †Paramys delicatus
 †Paramys leptodus
 †Parasauromalus
 †Parasauromalus olseni
 †Parectypodus
 †Pareumys
 †Pareumys grangeri
 †Pareumys guensburgi – type locality for species
 †Pareumys milleri – type locality for species
 †Pareumys troxelli
 †Paromomys
 †Paromomys depressidens
 †Paronychomys
 †Paronychomys lemredfieldi
 †Paropsocus – type locality for genus
 †Paropsocus disjunctus – type locality for species
 †Passaliscomys – type locality for genus
 †Passaliscomys priscus – type locality for species
 †Pauromys
 †Penetrigonias
 †Penetrigonias dakotensis
 †Pentacemylus
 †Pentacemylus leotensis
 †Pentacemylus progressus – type locality for species
 †Peradectes
 †Peradectes chesteri
  †Peratherium
 †Peratherium marsupium
 †Periptychus
 †Periptychus carinidens
 †Periptychus coarctatus
 Peromyscus
  †Peromyscus maniculatus
 Phenacomys
 †Phenacomys gryci – or unidentified comparable form
 †Phenacomys intermedius
 †Phygadeuon
 †Phygadeuon petrifactellus – type locality for species
  Phyllobius
 †Phyllobius avus
 †Phyllobius carcerarius
  †Phyllophaga
 †Phyllophaga avus – type locality for species
  Physa
 Picea
  Pinus
 †Plastomenoides
 †Plastomenoides lamberti
 †Plastomenus
 Plecia
 †Plecia woodruffi – type locality for species
 †Plesiolestes
 †Plesiolestes nacimienti
 †Poabromylus
 †Poabromylus kayi – type locality for species
 †Poebrodon
 †Poebrodon kayi – type locality for species
  †Polemonium – or unidentified comparable form
 †Presbyorniformipes
 †Presbyorniformipes feduccii – type locality for species
  †Presbyornis – type locality for genus
 †Presbyornis pervetus – type locality for species
 †Presbyornis recurvirostrus – type locality for species
 †Procaimanoidea – type locality for genus
 †Procaimanoidea kayi
 †Procaimanoidea utahensis – type locality for species
 †Procas
 †Procas vinculatus
 †Procynodictis
 †Procynodictis vulpiceps
 †Prodaphaenus
 †Prodaphaenus uintensis – type locality for species
 †Promioclaenus
 †Pronophlebia – type locality for genus
 †Pronophlebia rediviva – type locality for species
 †Propalaeosinopa – tentative report
 †Protadjidaumo
 †Protadjidaumo typus – type locality for species
 †Protictis
 †Protictis haydenianus
  †Protitanotherium
 †Protochriacus
 †Protochriacus simplex
 †Protoptychus
 †Protoptychus hatcheri
 †Protoreodon
 †Protoreodon minor – type locality for species
 †Protoreodon parvus
 †Protoreodon petersoni – type locality for species
 †Protoreodon pumilus – type locality for species
 †Protoselene
 †Protoselene griphus
  †Protylopus
 †Protylopus annectens – type locality for species
 †Protylopus petersoni
  †Proviverra
 †Proviverra longipes
 †Proviverroides
 †Proviverroides piercei – or unidentified comparable form
 †Proxestops – or unidentified comparable form
 †Proxestops silberlingii
 †Pseudodiplacodon
 †Pseudosalix – type locality for genus
 †Pseudosalix handleyi – type locality for species
 †Pseudotomus
 †Pseudotomus eugenei – type locality for species
 †Pseudotomus petersoni – type locality for species
  †Ptilodus
 †Ptilodus mediaevus
 †Ptilodus tsosiensis – or unidentified comparable form

R

 †Reithroparamys
 †Reithroparamys sciuroides – type locality for species
  Rhinoclemmys – report made of unidentified related form or using admittedly obsolete nomenclature

S

  †Saniwa
 †Saniwa ensidens
 †Sargus
 †Sargus vetus – type locality for species
 †Scenopagus
 †Scenopagus edenensis
 †Scenopagus priscus
 †Sciuravus
 †Sciuravus altidens – type locality for species
 †Sciuravus eucristadens
 †Sciuravus popi – type locality for species
 †Simidectes – type locality for genus
 †Simidectes magnus – type locality for species
 †Simidectes medius – type locality for species
 †Simimeryx
 †Simimeryx minutus
 †Simimys – or unidentified comparable form
  †Sinopa
 †Sinopa agilis
 †Sinopa major
 †Sinopa rapax
 †Smilodectes
 †Smilodectes gracilis
  †Smilodon
 †Smilodon fatalis – or unidentified comparable form
 Sorex
 †Sorex palustris
 Spermophilus
 †Spermophilus armatus – or unidentified comparable form
  †Sphenocoelus
 †Sphenocoelus hyognathus
 †Sthenodectes
 †Sthenodectes incisivum – type locality for species
 †Stygimys
 †Stygimys kuszmauli
 †Stylemys
 †Stylemys uintensis – type locality for species
  †Stylinodon
 †Stylinodon mirus
 †Syntomostylus
 †Syntomostylus rudis

T

  †Taeniolabis
 †Taeniolabis taoensis
 †Talpavus
 †Talpavus duplus – type locality for species
 †Talpavus nitidus
  †Tapocyon
 †Tapocyon robustus
 Taxidea
 †Taxidea taxus
 †Thisbemys
 †Thisbemys medius
 †Thisbemys uintensis – type locality for species
 Thomomys
 †Thomomys talpoides
 †Tilgidopsis – type locality for genus
 †Tilgidopsis haesitans – type locality for species
 Tinosaurus
 †Tinosaurus stenodon
 †Tricentes
 †Tricentes subtrigonus – type locality for species
 †Triplopus
 †Triplopus implicatus
 †Triplopus obliquidens
 †Triplopus rhinocerinus – type locality for species
  †Trogosus
 †Tylocephalonyx

U

 †Uintaceras
 †Uintaceras radinskyi – type locality for species
 †Uintacyon
 †Uintacyon acutus – type locality for species
 †Uintanius
 †Uintanius ameghini
 †Uintasorex
 †Uintasorex parvulus – or unidentified comparable form
  †Uintatherium
 †Utahia
 †Utahia kayi – type locality for species

V

 †Valenia
 †Valenia wilsoni
 †Viverravus
 †Viverravus gracilis
 †Viverravus minutus
 †Viverravus sicarius
 Viviparus
 Vulpes
  †Vulpes vulpes

X

 †Xestops
 †Xestops vagans
 †Xylotosyrphus – type locality for genus
 †Xylotosyrphus pulchrafenestra – type locality for species

Z

  Zapus
 †Zionodon – type locality for genus
 †Zionodon satanus – type locality for species
 †Zionodon walshi – type locality for species

References

 

Utah
Cenozoic
Cenozoic life